Hannah Munyard (born 4 August 2001) is an Australian rules footballer who plays for  in the AFL Women's (AFLW).

References

External links

 

Living people
2001 births
Western Bulldogs (AFLW) players
Australian rules footballers from South Australia
Sportswomen from South Australia
South Adelaide Football Club players (Women's)
Christies Beach Football Club players
Adelaide Football Club (AFLW) players